Buffalo Automation is an artificial intelligence (AI) startup that develops autonomous navigation technology for commercial ships, recreational boats, and water taxis with the goal to improve maritime safety. It is a private company based in Buffalo, New York. Thiru Vikram is the CEO of the company.

History 
Buffalo Automation was founded by Thiru Vikram, Alexander Zhitelzeyf and Emilie Reynolds, who were engineering students at the University at Buffalo. Originating as a university research project, the concept was transformed into a company in 2015.

AutoMate
The team developed AutoMate, a predictive system which uses artificial intelligence technology and neural networks to coordinate and integrate data, decisions, and actions based on nautical maps, cameras, sensors, thermal imaging, broadband radars, GPS, LiDAR and Automatic Identification System (AIS). The system allows autonomous identification and safe navigation around stationary objects, swimmers, and other vessels within the surrounding . Initially developed as a fleet management and autopilot solution for the commercial shipping industry, the technology has since been adapted for use with recreational boats, including yachts and motorboats. Initial tests were performed in 2015, using a -long catamaran equipped with the AutoMate system.

In addition to hazard identification and avoidance, the AutoMate system also employs neural networks to recognize navigation signs, help vessels maneuver in compliance with International Regulations for Preventing Collisions at Sea (COLREGS), and interpret weather conditions. The technology helps in fuel efficiency, which was tested in 2018 on vessels in the Great Lakes.

In early 2018, Buffalo Automation began tests of a -long autonomous pleasure boat made by Sea Ray, a boat manufacturer owned by the Brunswick Boat Group. Also in 2018, Buffalo Automation expanded its sales focus to Europe. Fully autonomous navigation of locks was in development as of 2020.

The Mayday
In 2020, Buffalo Automation introduced The Mayday (originally named Greycraft), a free app. Designed to encourage people to experiment with and experience artificial intelligence technology that is otherwise not readily accessible to the average person, The Mayday operates as a self-contained offline neural network capable of detecting boats, ships, and other vessels visible to a cell phone camera. The Mayday app is also used to hail Buffalo Automation's Greycraft self-driving water taxis.

Greycraft 
In 2021, Buffalo Automation unveiled a self-driving water taxi, Greycraft. Fully autonomous, Greycraft uses cameras, laser scanners, radar, satellite, GPS, compass information, and artificial intelligence (AI) to evaluate the surroundings and guide itself. The autonomous solar and electric-powered water taxi was first demonstrated to Knoxville Mayor Indya Kincannon on January 7, 2021. As part of the region's green urbanism efforts, as of 2021 Greycraft is pending government approval to allow public use as a water taxi or passenger ferry in East Tennessee. Upon approval, patrons would access the water taxi service using Buffalo Automation's Mayday ride-hailing app.

Greycraft's quiet engine and solar-charging system provide a sustainable transport alternative, minimize marine acoustic disruption, and avoid environmental impacts associated with fuel and oil residue leaked in aquatic environments. 

Trials of the United Kingdom's first robot water taxis, watercraft equipped with Buffalo Automation's AutoMate autonomous navigation system, were scheduled for summer 2020 in Plymouth (UK) but postponed as a result of the COVID-19 pandemic.

In July 2021, a Greycraft ferry began service in the Netherlands' Kagerplassen lake district, "Europe's first commercial robotaxi service". Subsidized by funding from the South Holland provincial government, the self-propelled Vaar met Ferry service connects pedestrian and bicyclists from Warmond-Kagerzoom and Leiderdorp to the Koudenhoorn Recreation Area. The ferry service was implemented in collaboration with the Delft University of Technology, Future Mobility Network, Buffalo Automation, and the South Holland provincial government in order to provide a sustainable transport option and reduce crowding on the existing access bridge as COVID restrictions have increased recreation area usage. Passengers use Buffalo Automation's Mayday ridesharing app to hail the robotaxi.

Buffalo Automation supplies the software and training to third party companies or organizations who own and operate the ferries.

Bifrost
In 2020, Buffalo Automation redeveloped its thermal imaging software to enable rapid skin temperature scanning of multiple people in a crowd for the purpose of detecting fever. This adaptation was initiated in response to a health care and public health sector unmet need created by the COVID-19 pandemic. Named Bifrost, the system operates as a Software as a service (SaaS) solution, where Buffalo Automation's convolutional neural network is combined with existing thermal imaging equipment in order to rapidly report the skin temperature of different facial regions of each individual in a crowd. In July 2020, the Bifrost Project was piloted at the entry to the University at Buffalo Neurosurgery Center of the Jacobs School of Medicine and Biomedical Sciences.

Funding 

Grants from SUNY and New York State business plan competition prizes helped bootstrap early activity.

In 2016, Buffalo Automation secured its first private placement, US$25,000 in pre-seed investments from Launch NY and Z80 Labs. In 2018, it raised a total of $900,000 in a seed funding round led by the Jacobs family office, with Z80 making a US$100,000 follow-on investment. 

In 2020, the company raised US$650,000 through two rounds of convertible note issuance. In the second, the University at Buffalo's Innovation Seed Fund made its inaugural venture capital investment, investing US$250,000 in Buffalo Automation. Varia Consulting Group subsequently matched that US$250,000 investment.

Awards and recognition 

 In 2015, Buffalo Automation won the inaugural Buffalo Student Sandbox, an accelerator program.
 In 2016, it won the University at Buffalo's Henry A. Panasci Jr. Technology Entrepreneurship Competition. The same year, the company was nominated as a finalist for the Innovation Award by Lloyd's List, and won the New York Business Plan Competition, under the Information Technology/Software category.
 In 2018, Buffalo Automation was a semifinalist in 43 North, a startup pitch competition.
In 2019, Buffalo Automation's flagship product, the AutoMate won the second annual XCELLENCE Awards by the Association for Unmanned Vehicle Systems International (AUVSI) for Detect & Avoid Solutions. NASA's ICAROUS placed second and Auterion's PX4 Avoidance was awarded third place.
In 2022, Buffalo Automation was listed on DarkRound as one of the 101 Most Innovative Taxi Service Companies.

See also 
 MV Yara Birkeland
 Piranha Unmanned Surface Vessel
 Roboat
 Scout (autonomous boat)
 Sea Hunter
 Thermography
 Non-contact thermography

References 

Autonomous ships
Companies based in Buffalo, New York
American companies established in 2015
Emerging technologies
Experimental vehicles
Robotics companies
Unmanned surface vehicles
Uncrewed vehicles
Marine electronics
Navigation
Navigation system companies
Technology companies established in 2015
2015 establishments in New York (state)
Solar-powered vehicles
Boating